Tallulah Falls Lake is a  reservoir with  of shoreline located in the Northeastern corner of Georgia in Rabun County. It is the fourth and smallest lake in a six-lake series created by hydroelectric dams operated by Georgia Power that follows the original course of the Tallulah River. The series starts upstream on the Tallulah River with Lake Burton followed by Lake Seed, Lake Rabun, Tallulah Falls Lake, Lake Tugalo and Lake Yonah.

Tallulah Falls Lake was formed in 1914 with the completion of the Tallulah Falls Dam, a concrete dam with diversion tunnel. The Tallulah Falls Hydroelectric Plant is located  lower than the dam at the lower end of the tunnel and has a generation capacity of 72,000 kilowatts.

Sources
Georgia Power Website for power plants
Georgia Power lake levels

External links

TopoQuest Map for Tallulah Falls Lake

Bodies of water of Rabun County, Georgia
Dams in Georgia (U.S. state)
Georgia Power dams
Historic American Engineering Record in Georgia (U.S. state)
Protected areas of Rabun County, Georgia
Reservoirs in Georgia (U.S. state)